Simeon Prior (May 16, 1754 – June 29, 1837) was a blacksmith and Revolutionary War soldier, who in 1802 along with his family founded Northampton Township, Ohio, now a part of Cuyahoga Falls, Ohio. The original family farm was located in what was called the Connecticut Western Reserve on the eastern shoulder of the Cuyahoga Valley.

Early life

Simeon Prior was born on May 16, 1754 in Norwich Connecticut. The Prior Family Archive contains a land deed of Simeon's first farm in Norwich, where his first children were born.  Later the family bought land and moved to his wife's hometown of Northampton, MA.

American Revolutionary War Service

During the American Revolutionary War, Prior was asked by Colonel John Durgey of Norwich, Connecticut, to be an armorer for the regiment the Colonel was raising.  Prior enlisted for a 9-month term and accompanied Colonel Durgey to New York.  He later joined a regiment on Painter's Hook.

He served in the unit that provided escort and bodyguard services to George Washington.  He was present during the crossing of the Delaware River after the Battle of Trenton.

His pension petition for service during the war was submitted by Mr. Elisha Whittlesey.

Marriage
He married Katharine Wight on January 1, 1781, in New England.

Settling Northampton

Prior moved to Northampton Township, Ohio, with Katharine and their ten children in 1802.  He named the township for Northampton, Massachusetts, where he had previously resided.  The Prior farm consisted of 400 acres. Other settlers had joined them in establishing a community by 1809. In 1810, Simeon Prior and David Parker were Trustees of Northampton Township, and Simeon's oldest son William Prior Sr. was Supervisor of Highways. An artifact from the Prior Family Archive details this information, and is the oldest known existing government record for Northampton Township.

Death and legacy
Simeon died on June 29, 1837 and was buried on his property at the corner of Chart and State Roads, in Cuyahoga Falls, Ohio. Simeon and Katherine Prior's bodies were later moved to Harrington Cemetery in Summit County, Ohio.

The Prior Family monument is located in Harrington Cemetery located in Cuyahoga Falls, Ohio.

On June 24, 2020, descendants of Simeon and Katharine Prior, Chapters of Sons and Daughters of the American Revolution, and color guard of Cuyahoga Falls Police and Fire Fighters, gathered to dedicate a new headstone for Simeon and his wife Katharine.  Kenneth Clarke and Emery Prior, both direct descendants of Simeon, collaborated to replace the weatherworn and mostly indecipherable marble headstone of Northampton Ohio's founders with a new headstone carved out of granite from Barre, Vermont. The front of the new headstone copies the text of the old headstone and on the back are the names of Simeon's children and a short history of the family. The new text on the back of the stone reads as such: in 1802 Simeon and Katharine (Wight) Prior from Northampton, Massachusetts, with their children below, were the first settlers of Northampton Township, now Cuyahoga Falls, Ohio. Sarah, 1781–1847; William, 1783–1872; David, 1784–1866; Elisha, 1786– 1867; John 1788–1790; Mary, 1789–1880; Judith, 1791–1862; Gurden, 179 3–1885; Lydia, 1795–1842; Jerusha, 1797–1846; Charles, 1799–1879; Elizabeth, 1801–1874; Abigail, 1803–1807; Joseph, 1805–1806; Erastus, 1809–1866. Rededicated by the Family in 2020. The old headstone artifact is now part of the Cuyahoga Falls Historical Society collection.  

In September of 2020, Kenneth Clarke published the book "Wolves and Flax: The Prior Family in the Cuyahoga Wilderness," based on the Prior Family Archive and other historical texts. The book received reviews in the Cleveland Plain Dealer,  the Akron Beacon Journal and other print and online news sources.

References

1754 births
1837 deaths
People from Summit County, Ohio
Military personnel from Ohio
American blacksmiths
Continental Army soldiers